Czaja is a surname. Notable people with the surname include:

 Dominik Czaja (born 1995), Polish rower
 Emile Czaja (1909–1970), Australian-Indian wrestler
 Herbert Czaja (1914–1997), German politician
 Jakub Czaja (born 1980), Polish athlete
 Mario Czaja (born 1975), German politician
 Mary Czaja (born 1963), American businesswoman and politician
 Wiesław Czaja (born 1952), Polish volleyball player and coach
 Zbigniew Czaja (born 1958), Polish slalom canoeist

See also
 
 Czajka (disambiguation)

Polish-language surnames